The 2021 National budget of Bangladesh was presented by the  Minister of Finance Mustafa Kamal on 3 June 2021. The National budget is for the fiscal year beginning on 1 July 2021, and ending on 30 June 2022. The budget was the second to be presented amid the Coronavirus pandemic.

History 
The National Budget is the annual financial statement of Bangladesh; an estimate of income and expenditure of the government on a periodical basis. Under Article 87.(1) of the Constitution of Bangladesh, it is a compulsory task of the government. Upon achieving independence, the first budget of Bangladesh was presented by Tajuddin Ahmad.

Significant announcements 

This consists of  allocated for operating and other expenditures, while  has been allocated for the Annual Development Programme.
The allocation for climate change will be spent across 25 ministries and divisions.
The project is aiming to spread Islamic fraternity, real Islamic values and practices, conduct research, create infrastructure for prayers for both men and women, and provide religious teaching and training.

Controversy 

They also demanded a separate ministry for religious minorities similar to India and Pakistan.

On 19 June 2021, Bangladesh Jatiya Hindu Mahajote's secretary-general Gobinda Chandra Pramanik, at Dhaka Reporters Unity, demanded the construction of at least one model temple in each of the upazilas across the country, a separate election system for the Hindu community, keeping 60 reserved seats for Hindus, the formation of a ministry for minority communities, appointing a cabinet minister from the minority community, and allowing a one-day government holiday to observe Rathajatra.

References

Further reading 
Full text of budget speech delivered by Finance Minister Mustafa Kamal.

National budgets of Bangladesh
2021 government budgets
2021 in Bangladesh